In the United States Navy, the expeditionary strike group (ESG) is a coordinated group of surface ships, aircraft, submarines, and other naval assets.  In contrast to carrier strike groups (CSGs), which emphasize air power and are led by a supercarrier, ESGs are strongly suited for amphibious warfare and are led by an amphibious assault ship (currently of the Wasp or America classes).  The ESG concept was introduced in the early 1990s, based on the Naval Expeditionary Task Force. The U.S. Navy fields nine expeditionary strike groups and ten carrier strike groups, in addition to surface action groups. 

The ESG concept combines the capabilities of surface action groups, submarines, and maritime patrol aircraft with those of amphibious ready groups (ARGs) and Marine expeditionary units (MEUs) (special operations capable) to provide greater combat capabilities to theater combatant commanders. An expeditionary strike force (ESF) integrates the CSG and ESG with the sea-basing functions provided by the maritime prepositioning force (future) to provide an even more potent capability.

History

The United States Navy has always been involved in developing different military concepts to improve the rapid deployment of naval power and troops from one point to another.  One of these concepts was the amphibious ready group (ARG). The ARG consisted of a group of various ships known as an Amphibious Task Force (ATF) and a Landing Force (LF), which normally consisted of United States Marines and, on occasion, could consist of United States Army troops.

An ARG is composed of an amphibious assault ship (LHA/LHD), a landing platform/dock (LPD), a Landing Ship, Dock (LSD) , and a Marine Expeditionary Unit (MEU), which includes a Marine Infantry battalion landing team, AV-8B Harrier II aircraft, CH-53 Sea Stallion, CH-46 Sea Knight, AH-1 Sea Cobra, and UH-1 Huey helicopters.

The Navy had two to three ARGs deployed at a given time. Normally one of the ARGs was in the Mediterranean Sea and Persian Gulf or Indian Ocean area, and the other two were in the western Pacific Ocean.

Early 1990s – present

In the early 1990s, the U.S. Navy introduced a new concept based on the ARG, the naval expeditionary task force or, as it is also known, the expeditionary strike group (ESG). The ESG is similar to the ARG except that with the ESG concept, the U.S. Navy would be able to deploy almost double the number of independent operational groups, from 19 to 38.  In addition, the ESG included surface warships and submarine escorts, similar to a carrier strike group (previously a carrier battle group).

An ESG is composed of an amphibious assault ship (Landing helicopter assault (LHA)/Landing helicopter dock (LHD)), a dock landing ship (LSD), an Landing Platform/Dock (LPD) , a Marine expeditionary unit, AV-8B Harrier II aircraft, CH-53E Super Stallion helicopters, CH-46E Sea Knight helicopters or more recently, MV-22B tiltrotors, and other aircraft that comprise a USMC composite squadron. Cruisers, destroyers, and attack submarines may deploy with either an expeditionary strike group or a carrier strike group.

As originally envisioned in the 1990s, the ESG concept allowed the Navy to field 12 expeditionary strike groups and 12 carrier strike groups, in addition to surface action groups centered on Iowa class battleships. Thus, the Navy and Marine Corps forces could launch Marines via landing craft and helicopters as warships and submarines struck inland targets with aircraft, missiles and shells.  However, defense budget reductions in the mid-1990s, coupled with retirements of older aircraft carriers and amphibious assault ships without one-for-one replacements, has reduced the original 12 x 12 ESG/CSG construct to fewer groups due to fewer ship hulls to support those said groups.

Expeditionary Strike Groups

Current ESGs
The following is a list of U.S. military ESGs:
 
Wasp Expeditionary Strike Group – 
Wasp ESG, from June to December 1991 she was on deployment to the Mediterranean. From February to August 1993 she took part in Operation Restore Hope and Operation Continue Hope off Somalia. Wasp conducted a Mediterranean deployment from August 1995 to February 1996. The Wasp was again deployed in 2004 with the 22 MEU in support of Operation Enduring Freedom
Essex Expeditionary Strike Group – 
Kearsarge Expeditionary Strike Group – 
Boxer Expeditionary Strike Group – 
Bataan Expeditionary Strike Group – 
Iwo Jima Expeditionary Strike Group  
Makin Island Expeditionary Strike Group – 
America Expeditionary Strike Group – 
Tripoli Expeditionary Strike Group -

Former ESG units

This is a list of former ESGs and similarly themed predecessor organizations:
Named groups (These were named for the s that lead them. All ships in this class have since been decommissioned
Tarawa Expeditionary Strike Group (before "Tarawa Amphibious Ready Group") — 
Saipan Expeditionary Strike Group – 
Belleau Wood Expeditionary Strike Group – 
Nassau Expeditionary Strike Group – 
Peleliu Expeditionary Strike Group –  - in September 1997, USS Peleliu ARG took part in Fleet Battle Experiment – Bravo's "Silent Fury" phase along with the Constellation Carrier Battle Group. The Peleliu ARG was deployed to the Persian Gulf in 1997 and participated in Exercise Eager Mace 98.
Bonhomme Richard Expeditionary Strike Group –  - a  ship that was destroyed by a fire in while in port.

Numbered groups (Amphibious Groups since redesignated as Expeditionary Strike Groups)
Expeditionary Strike Group 1 – Deployed to the Indian Ocean and Persian Gulf in 2003 in support of the Global War on Terror. It included the Los Angeles-class nuclear attack submarine  and the only operational Advanced SEAL Delivery System, a minisub deployed from the Greeneville that was used by Navy SEALs for special operations missions.
Expeditionary Strike Group 2 – In 1978, Amphibious Group 2 comprised Amphibious Squadron 2, Amphibious Squadron 4, Amphibious Squadron 6, and Amphibious Squadron 8, all at Norfolk, VA. In 1984 it still comprised the same four squadrons, parenting a mix of LHAs, LKAs, LPHs, LPDs, LSDs, and LSTs. Commander, Amphibious Group 2 was disestablished 31 December 2006, and commissioned as Commander, Expeditionary Strike Group 2, per CNO guidance regarding alignment of Expeditionary Strike Groups and Amphibious Groups. This culminated nearly a year of preparation to become an operational command ready to deploy to the Middle East. Commander, Expeditionary Strike Group 2 is an Echelon 4 command, previously reporting to Commander, U.S. Second Fleet. In 1978, a Naval Reserve Force ship, was assigned to Amphibious Group 2.
Expeditionary Strike Group 3
Amphibious Group 4 – , part of the Northern Attack Force, served as flagship of Rear Admiral Lawrence F. Reifsnider, Commander Amphibious Group 4, for the Battle of Okinawa in 1944. Commanded by Rear Admiral Eugene B. Fluckey from November 1960 to October 1961. Active in the 1960s, seemingly up to 1968–69, in the Atlantic Fleet. 
Expeditionary Strike Group Seven
USS Essex ESG (ESG-FDNF early 2003). The USS Essex (LHD-2) is the second ship in the all new Wasp class of multipurpose amphibious assault ships and was commissioned on 17 October 1992 in San Diego, California. The mission of the Essex is to conduct prompt, sustained combat operations at sea, as the centerpiece of the Navy's amphibious strategy, from the Sea. Essex ESG is also known as ESG 7 and is led by the Commander, Task Force 76.

Marine Air-Ground Task Forces

The Marine-Air-Ground Task Forces, or MAGTF, are a combined component of air and amphibious ground forces of the United States Marine Corps.  They consist of either the Marine Expeditionary Force(MEF), Marine Expeditionary Brigade(MEB), or the smaller Marine Expeditionary Unit(MEU) that deploys either from the United States Navy's Expeditionary Strike Groups or Amphibious ready groups.

The MAGTF are composed of four basic elements:

Command Element (CE) – Serves as the headquarters for the entire unit and allows a single command to exercise control over all ground, aviation, and combat service support forces.
Ground Combat Element (GCE) – Provides the MAGTF with its main combat punch.  Built around a Marine infantry battalion, the GCE is reinforced with tanks, artillery, amphibious vehicles, engineers, and reconnaissance assets.
Aviation Combat Element (ACE) – Consists of a composite medium helicopter squadron containing transport helicopters of various models and capabilities, attack helicopters and jets, air defense teams, and all necessary ground support assets.
Logistics Combat Element (LCE) – Providing the MAGTF with mission-essential support such as medical/dental assistance, motor transport, supply, equipment maintenance, and landing is the mission of the LCE.

The Aviation Command Element now consists of VMM composite squadron.  The CH-46 was retired from active service and replaced with the MV-22B aircraft.

References

External links

Combatant groups of the United States Navy
Amphibious units and formations of the United States Navy